Sejenice is a small roadside settlement east of Čatež in the Municipality of Trebnje in eastern Slovenia. The area is part of the traditional region of Lower Carniola. The municipality is now included in the Southeast Slovenia Statistical Region.

References

External links
Sejenice at Geopedia

Populated places in the Municipality of Trebnje